Issigau is a municipality in Upper Franconia in the district of Hof in Bavaria in Germany. In lies on the Issig River.

References

Hof (district)